Amatignak Island is a member of the Delarof Islands (western Andreanof Islands), in Alaska's Aleutian archipelago.  The southernmost point of Alaska is on this island, as well as the westernmost longitude of Alaska, the United States, and North America.

It is uninhabited.

References

Delarof Islands
Uninhabited islands of Alaska
Islands of Alaska
Islands of Unorganized Borough, Alaska